Goniodiscaster foraminatus is a species of sea stars in the family Oreasteridae.

References

Oreasteridae
Animals described in 1916